A ski jumping hill is a sports venue used for ski jumping. They vary in size from temporary handmade snow structures to permanent competition venues. At the top is an in-run where the jumper runs down to generate sufficient speed, before reaching the jump. The skier is then airborne until landing on the landing slope. The last part of the hill is the out-run, which may be either flat or even uphill, allowing the jumper to stop. The steepest point of the hill is the construction point, which is used to determine the score of a particular length. The size of a hill is measured in the hill size. Hills with a hill size exceeding HS185 are designated ski flying hills; there are five such hills in the world.

Structure

The top of the hill is the start. This allows the jury to regulate the speed of the jumpers in varying wind conditions, by shortening or lengthening the distance along the in-run. The platform has a bar across it, which the jumper sits on. By leaning forward, the jumper will naturally start to glide down the prepared tracks along the in-run. The in-run normally has an angle of 38 to 36 degrees, which then curves into a transition; the last part of the in-run, the take-off, typically has an angle between 7 and 12 degrees downhill. The skier will land on the landing slope, and the rules allow jumpers to land up to ten percent past the construction point. Past the landing slope is the outrun, which is either flat or even uphill, where the skier can slow down.

In 2004, the International Ski Federation replaced the calculation point as the measurement of the size of a hill with hill size. The hill size is the length from the takeoff in a straight line to the knoll and then along the level of the landing slope to the hill size point. The hill size point is calculated based on the technical data of a hill based on radius, angle of inclination and record distance. The calculation point or K-point is slightly further up in the hill and denotes the point where the landing slope is the steepest. It is still used for the calculation of distance points, which along with style points determine the winner of an event. For hills up to large, the scoring system grants 60 points to jumps which reach the critical point. For ski flying hills, 120 points are granted for the critical point length. Based on the hill's length, distance points are calculated, which are added for each meter beyond the critical point and subtracted for each point shorter than the critical point. A meter has more distance points in smaller hills. Hills also have a fall line; a jumper who falls or otherwise touches the ground with their body after the fall line is not penalized.

The measuring of a distance in a hill was traditionally done by people who were positioned along the hill, who would signal where the skier landed. This has been supplanted by an advanced video system, which allows measurements in 0.5-meter increments.

Classification

See also
List of ski jumping hills
Red Bull 400

References

Ski jumping
Sports venues by type